Neal George Caffrey (born Neal George Bennett) is the main character of the USA Network original series White Collar. Neal is a criminal consultant for the White Collar Crime Division of the FBI in New York City. He is a world-class forger and conman, with a fondness for art, fine wine, Sy Devore suits, fedoras, and beautiful women. Neal speaks eight languages, including conversational Swahili, and has 27 known aliases.

Caffrey was suspected of hundreds of thefts before FBI Agent Peter Burke apprehended him. Neal received a four-year sentence for bond forgery. After escaping from prison — and getting caught once again by Agent Burke when he is found in his ex-girlfriend Kate's apartment with an empty bottle of wine — Neal struck a bargain in exchange for his release from prison after he identifies counterfeiting materials from Peter Burke's suit. Neal helps the FBI catch the most cunning white-collar criminals in the country. Now, Neal must walk the line between his new job as a top FBI consultant, and his old life as a white-collar criminal.

Matt Bomer portrays Neal Caffrey on White Collar. Bomer describes the character as having "the veneer of the charming, hyper-intelligent, eloquent, sly mastermind, but underneath, he was really a kind of die hard romantic who would go to any lengths to find the love of his life."

Personality 
Neal is presented as a charming, sophisticated gentleman with a wide range of knowledge, from art to foreign languages, most of which seems to be self-taught; he reveals early in Season 2 that he did not graduate high school. He is described as a romantic, which is shown when he breaks out of prison to track down Kate Moreau, his girlfriend and true love, after she breaks up with him. Neal is also highly secretive, and does not trust anyone completely. In the Season 1 episode "Threads", he tells Mozzie that he lied to both Mozzie and Kate about the location of his stash of stolen goods, telling Mozzie it was in Portland and Kate in San Diego, in order to test their loyalty to him. Neal rarely makes himself vulnerable, hiding behind a facade of indifference or cheerfulness when he is upset, even after a major personal tragedy in the Season 1 finale. He does not enjoy talking about his past, preferring the mystery.

Neal is a people person. His confidence makes it easy for him to con people (particularly women), and he frequently draws attention to himself wherever he goes. Jeff Eastin says of casting Neal: "I wanted a guy who walked into a room and every head turned.  Because this guy is elegant, and he’s sophisticated, and he’s smart and he loves the attention."

History

Early life and background 
Born Neal George Bennett (Compromising Positions | Season 4: episode 7), Neal grew up in United States Federal Witness Protection Program under the name Danny Brooks in St. Louis, Missouri. His mother told him that his father, James Bennett, a police detective in the Washington, D.C. Metro Police Department, died when he was two years old, while taking out a bunch of bad guys. Neal grew up wanting to be just like him: intending to be a police officer and training with guns. However, when he was 18, Ellen Parker, his father's former partner, told him the truth: His father is still alive, but is not a hero. James had been arrested for the murder of a fellow police officer when Neal was three years old. (Diminishing Returns | Season 4: episode 3) After finding out this information, Neal left WITSEC and took his mother's maiden name, Caffrey. Now, he can still use guns, but prefers not to, and shows strong distaste towards firearms in general. Neal did not graduate from high school; he also did not attend college, although he has, (most likely) fictitiously acquired three MBAs and two doctorate degrees (Copycat Caffrey | Season 2: episode 3).

He learns more about his father only years later, when he asks Ellen for more information: After he was arrested, James told Ellen that their department was filled with dirty cops who had set him up. But then, his father confessed to the murder, and turned state's evidence on the Flynn organization, a crime family with some of the police department on the payroll, including Neal's father. His testimony brought down most of the organization. Neal, his mother, and Ellen were placed in witness protection. (Gloves Off | Season 4:  episode 9)

Life as a con artist 
Neal came to New York City in his early twenties. Mozzie, also a con artist, was conned by Neal out of $500 and later approached him about pulling a long con on a CEO named Vincent Adler. For approximately six months, Neal worked at Adler Financial Management under the alias Nicholas Halden. Through Adler, Neal meets fellow thief Alexandra "Alex" Hunter when she attempted to steal information from Adler. The two ended up spending the night together. He fell in love with Adler's assistant, Kate Moreau, who eventually became his girlfriend. Before Neal could complete the con, Adler figured out Neal's true identity and his con and ran off with a billion dollars, leaving all of his employees—including Neal and Kate—jobless and broke. Adler left only one dollar in the account Neal was after and a password that was an anagram for "Nice Try Neal".  After this, Neal, Kate, and Mozzie began running cons together. Neal refers to Vincent Adler as "the man who made me who I am today." He follows Adler's advice to "assault the commonplace every chance we get, from the clothes we wear to the art we collect, to the women in our lives."  (Forging Bonds | Season 2:  episode 11)

Neal tried to persuade Kate to leave for Europe with him. Kate got upset when he mentioned Copenhagen, because she knew that Alex Hunter had contacted him about a job there. She accused Neal of trying to con her, instead of simply telling her that. She stayed in New York while Neal left for Copenhagen. Upon his return, Neal found that Kate was hiding from him and started doing bigger cons and forgeries, trying to catch her attention. The FBI tracked Kate down and, realizing that Neal had no idea where Kate was, they set a trap for Neal by leaking her whereabouts and waiting for him to go to her. (Forging Bonds | Season 2:  episode 11)

Relationships

Peter Burke 
Agent Peter Burke was the case agent assigned to catch Neal Caffrey. He spent three years chasing Neal before finally arresting him. Neal sent Peter birthday cards each year while he was in prison. Burke is considered the only man capable of catching Caffrey. (Pilot | Season 1: episode 1) The relationship between the two of them is characterized by mutual respect and mistrust. With Neal, Peter follows the motto "Trust but Verify," which means he checks Neal's tracking information every day to see where he's gone when he's not at work (The Portrait | Season 1: episode 5). However, Peter does consider Neal a partner, a friend, and one of the cleverest people he knows (Pilot | Season 1: episode 1, All In | Season 1: episode 6, Hard Sell | Season 1: episode 8). Neal trusts Peter more than anyone else in his life, including Mozzie (Vital Signs | Season 1: episode 10). Together they form a remarkable partnership. Neal Caffrey uses his criminal background to go undercover while Peter Burke keeps the investigation focused and on-track.

Season 1 
During White Collar's first season, the duo is assigned cases ranging from art theft to jewelry heists to recovering stolen jade elephants. Despite reservations on Burke's part regarding the sincerity of Caffrey's aims, as well as Caffrey's occasional mistrust of Burke, the two build a sincere friendship in addition to their effective partnership. However, on several occasions Burke is convinced that Caffrey was behind the crimes that they are investigating. Neal, meanwhile, keeps secrets from Peter, especially when it comes to tracking down Kate Moreau. However, Neal's private investigation eventually requires Peter's help. When Neal is set to run away with Kate in finale, Peter intercepts him at the airport and asks: "You said goodbye to everyone but me. Why?" To which Neal eventually replies, "Cause you're the only one who could change my mind." (Out of the Box | Season 1: episode 14)

Season 2 
The cases in season two lead to a growing understanding between Neal and Peter. A manhunt for a fugitive FBI agent causes Peter Burke to go on the run with Caffrey's aid (Prisoner's Dilemma | Season 2: episode 7). When Burke is suspected of planting evidence, Neal assists him in an intricate con to prove his innocence (Burke's Seven | Season 2: episode 10). Neal Caffrey becomes torn between the need for revenge for Kate's death and the justice Burke insists on within the legal system. When Caffrey corners Kate Moreau's suspected killer, he is ‘talked down’ by Peter Burke (Point Blank | Season 2: episode 9). When Neal Caffrey goes undercover with a thief looking for that one last score, he wonders if he's seeing an older image of himself. "If ever you do decide to grow up, you should realize this one thing," Peter Burke tells Neal. "You can either be a con or a man—you can’t be both." (Countermeasures | Season 2: episode 13) Later, the duo switch identities, with Peter Burke pretending to be Neal Caffrey and vice versa, giving them both a first-hand look at what it is like to be in the other's shoes (Power Play | Season 2: episode 15).  At the end of the season, Mozzie swipes a lost cache of art amassed by the Nazis (known variously as the U-boat, music box, Nazi, or Nazi sub treasure). Unfortunately, Peter Burke suspects Neal as the true perpetrator of the theft when he spies a piece of Neal's painting among the debris. The scene shatters the relationship between Neal and Peter. (Under the Radar | Season 2: episode 16)

Season 3 
The trust that has slowly been accumulating between FBI Agent Peter Burke and Neal Caffrey dissolves in the explosion at the warehouse. Their differences, however, must be set aside when Burke's wife is kidnapped by Caffrey's nemesis Matthew Keller. "You," Neal Caffrey tells Peter Burke when asked why he did not simply take the Nazi treasure and run. "Elizabeth, Sara. The view out that window, stepping off the elevator Monday morning. All of it. I have a life here." (Checkmate | Season 3: episode 11)

Season 4 

The Plot continues after Neal and Mozzie run off to Cape Verde and are brought back by Burke. The season mainly focuses on Neal's Father, James, who comes back to New York to hunt for a box hidden within the city. It is Later revealed that the box contains information on either James or Senator Pratt, the new antagonist of the series,

Season 5 

Peter is about to be prosecuted for murder, which could end his FBI career even if he were acquitted. Elizabeth urges Neal to save him at any cost. Neal is contacted by the Dutchman, Curtis Hagan (Mark Sheppard), the man he helped Peter convict of forgery in their first case together.

Disillusioned, Peter tells Elizabeth he wants to stay in his current position closer to field work; she agrees but wants to keep the job in DC. A bitter Neal asks Mozzie to circumvent the new anklet. After Mozzie leaves, Neal recognizes and confronts a man who has been following him. He is then grabbed from behind and thrown in a van, and his anklet is removed and thrown away.

Season 6 
The man who kidnapped Neal reveals that he needs his help to steal something in order to join an international and high profile thief group called Pink Panther. Instead of helping the guy to join the group, Neal joins the group himself in order to bring it down as a part of a deal with the FBI to set him free for good. Unexpectedly, Keller also became part of the group in order to get the same deal with Interpol.

At the same time, Elizabeth returned to New York and announced her pregnancy. In the final showdown between Neal and Keller, Keller shot Neal and left him for dead in the arms of Peter. Sometime after Neal's death, Peter and Elizabeth named their first son Neal in an homage to Caffrey. It is revealed by a clue from Mozzie that Neal is apparently still alive and living in Paris.

Mozzie
Mozzie, often called Moz short for Mozart, is Neal's partner in crime and Neal's best friend. Mozzie was orphaned as a baby and raised in an orphanage in Detroit. His love of literature came from the man who found him and ran the orphanage, Mr. Jeffries.  Mozzie started his criminal career by running cons on bullies, then running numbers for book makers until he became the brains behind the most successful and notorious book maker, "The Dentist of Detroit."  Only years later was it revealed that Mozzie was the Dentist and that he had conned a Detroit crime boss out of $500,000 when he was barely a teenager.  Mozzie is a conspiracy nut and at one time believed that his parents may have been spies and that was why they could not raise him.

Mozzie first met Neal after Neal got the better of him when Mozzie was pulling the "Find the Lady" three-card Monte con in the park not long after Neal moved to New York. Mozzie later approached Neal about pulling a long con on a CEO named Vincent Adler. Though the plan eventually failed, their friendship has flourished. Mozzie is the one who beckons Neal to a life of indulgence, wealth and pleasure, at the same time as FBI agent Peter Burke is pushing Neal toward respectability. "This is a guy who never liked other people," says Willie Garson, the actor who plays Mozzie. "He has never thought he needed people around. But Neal brought him out of his shell and now he’s not so sure." During the first season, Mozzie uses his various connections to the criminal world to help Neal with both his investigations with Peter and his private investigations into Kate's disappearance. During the second season, Mozzie becomes much more involved with the investigation into Kate's murder, discovering the identity of the last person Kate spoke to (Fowler) and breaking the code of the music box. In the season finale, unbeknownst to Neal, Mozzie steals the treasure linked to the music box and plans to share it with Neal. This causes Neal a great deal of trouble during season three, as Peter suspects him of the theft. He is not the only one: Neal's old competitor, Matthew Keller, comes to claim the treasure as well. Mozzie wants Neal to leave the country with him, but Neal is unwilling to throw away his life in New York. They are finally forced to flee, because of a D.C. Art Crimes agent with a yearning to make Neal his asset. Neal and Mozzie take refuge on the non-extraditing island of Cape Verde, living a lavish lifestyle in a seaside villa, until brought back to New York by Agent Burke. Mozzie goes back to street cons after Neal faked his death.

Alexandra "Alex" Hunter 
Alex is an old accomplice of Neal's. He first met her when he worked for Vincent Adler under the alias of Nick Halden, and she was attempting to steal information on Adler. Alex can tell Neal is not really who he says he is, and the two end up spending the night together the first day they meet, even though Neal is currently pining for Kate. Afterwards, Alex tells him about the music box for the first time. They work together again to steal it in Copenhagen, but the con goes wrong and Alex ends up in the hospital, where Neal leaves her. The next time they see each other, he is out of prison and needs her help tracking down the music box again, which he plans on giving to Fowler in exchange for Kate. Though at first wary of his connections to the FBI, Alex agrees to help him, and they concoct an elaborate theft to steal the box. However, she double crosses him at the last minute and runs off with the box for herself. She later changes her mind and returns it to Neal, admitting that she doesn't want this to be goodbye, implying that she still has feelings for him. After Kate's plane blows up, Alex goes underground for a while to avoid the mysterious people who are searching for the music box, later resurfacing to assist Neal in an FBI investigation. He helps her get out of the country (along with a valuable Matisse that she stole), and before she leaves for Italy, Alex gives him a piece of the music box and kisses him.

They later see each other again in the Season 2 mid-season finale "Point Blank". Alex has snuck back into the country, still hiding from the people searching for her and the music box. Neal offers to help get this target off her back, sending her to steal the box again, this time from FBI Agent Diana Barrigan's apartment, and donate it to the Russian Heritage Museum, finally ending her involvement with the box. This time, she gives Neal her number before she leaves.

In the season finale "Under The Radar", Alex has been kidnapped by Vincent Adler, followed shortly by Peter and Neal. This is directly after the realization that she is the granddaughter of the man who received the final transmission from the Nazi submarine that Adler is looking for, and that the fractal in the music box leads to. She explains that her grandfather encoded the fractal into the box with hopes of someday finding the treasure for himself, but died before he could. He did manage to indirectly give Alex the code to open the submarine hatch, and she uses this knowledge to help Peter and Neal get in. After a near-death experience at the hands of Adler, Neal and Alex, relieved at being alive, share a kiss, which is seen by Neal's current girlfriend Sara Ellis. Alex and Sara later meet, and Alex quickly realizes that she and Neal are involved. Alex gives Neal her blessing and one final kiss goodbye, as well as likening him to the Nazi treasure: some wonderful fantasy that's just out of reach.

Kate Moreau 
Kate is the driving force behind the majority of Neal's actions throughout the series. When she breaks up with him while he is in prison, he quickly escapes in order to find her, only to be two days late. Neal is convinced that she is in trouble, a belief further enforced when he sees a picture of her at an ATM with a mysterious hand on her shoulder. Neal calls the man "The Man With The Ring" because of the strange ring he is wearing on his pinky finger. She tells Mozzie (still over the phone) that this is the only way, before disappearing again.

Over time, it is revealed that Kate may or may not be being controlled by corrupt FBI Agent Garrett Fowler, who is working for Vincent Adler, a former employer of Neal and Kate's. Neal manages to make a deal with Fowler, giving him a mysterious music box in exchange for life with Kate. Neal is about to board the private jet that contains Kate, but is slowed down by Peter. Before Neal can make a decision of staying or going, the jet explodes, killing Kate.

Season 2 follows Neal's search for Kate's killer, eventually leading him to Adler. It is never fully explained whether Kate was willingly working for Adler or not, and if she ever truly loved Neal. In a flashback episode, it is revealed that Kate was originally Adler's assistant, and Neal met her while under the alias of Nicolas Halden, trying to con Adler out of his money. They fell in love, and when Adler vanished with all of their savings, Neal finally tells her his true identity, and they become partners in crime together. Kate leaves Neal, however, when he tries to con her into going to Copenhagen to work with Alex. He pulls off several of the biggest cons and thefts of his career (including stealing a Raphael that he and Kate admired when they first met) in order to get her attention again. The FBI realizes this, and leaks Kate's location to him in order to have him walk into a sting, which he does, despite knowing the risks. He is reunited with Kate just long enough for them to confess their love for one another, and is arrested by Peter quickly afterwards. Kate visits him in prison every week for almost four years before breaking up with him, leaving him heartbroken, and her eventual death haunts him throughout Season 2. He also reveals to Mozzie that he planned for a marriage and family with Kate, and had hidden a 2.5 million dollar ring in the park where they used to go. By the end of the season, he has moved on from her death and found closure and peace.

Sara Ellis 
Sara is an insurance investigator for Sterling Bosch, which insured a Raphael painting stolen by Neal. She testified against him at his trial, but he was not found guilty of the crime. In the trial, it is revealed that Sara thought Neal was a sociopath. When Neal is working as a consultant for the FBI he works closely with Sara as she is helping with a case at the FBI. Although she is initially hesitant towards Neal they soon grow closer and share a few intimate encounters that lead to a relationship. However, Neal and Sara's relationship officially ends after Sara finds out about the stolen treasure, and realizes that he's been lying to her, Peter, & the FBI and that he's still a con man. She is further upset by the idea that he could suddenly disappear without even saying goodbye — which is intensified by the fact that Sara's sister disappeared when she was 13.

Whilst not romantically involved, Neal and Sara work on a case which forces Sara to pretend to date an Ex. This causes some jealousy on Neal's part indicating he still has feelings for her. Neal and Sara start a 'friends who have fun' relationship until Sara announces that she has accepted a job in London. While working one final case, Neal fake proposes to Sara but it is clear that he meant every word of it. Sara then moves away leaving Neal and ultimately ending their relationship.

Season 2 
They share a slightly antagonistic relationship at first when they are forced to work in "Unfinished Business" together on a case, which isn't helped when Neal, working undercover, unknowingly breaks into her house with a gun, only to have her pull one on him. He explains the situation, and they agree to fake her death to fool the man who put the hit out on her in the first place. They are able to forge a slightly closer relationship. 

However, in addition to wanting to be on good terms with Sara again, Neal has ulterior motives for being nice to her because he had Kate's flight recorder data mailed to Sara's house and needs to get to it. He finds his opportunity when offering to give Sara a lift home after she is "brought back to life," but is not able to retrieve the recording. Mozzie breaks in instead and successfully steals it, which is found out by Sara, returning her and Neal's relationship to its original level. She later learns the whole story about Kate, and agrees to help him with the investigation into her death.

Gradually, they begin to respect each other more, and eventually begin a romantic relationship in the finale lead-in "Power Play", when they make out during a blackout in a library. They make tentative plans in the next episode, but things are temporarily halted when she sees him kissing Alex after a near-death experience. They work past this, however, and she forgives him. At one point, Sara tells Neal her younger sister ran away when she was 13 and she never found out what happened to her.

Season 3 
They start a relationship and while they maintain that they are just having fun, seem to genuinely be falling for each other. This is complicated by Neal and Mozzie's plan to run away with their hidden stash of treasure. in the episode "Taking Account", Neal and Sara temporarily move in together while her apartment is under construction, and Neal finds himself enjoying the idyllic lifestyle he has with her. At one point, he comes extremely close to asking her to come with him and Mozzie when they leave, but backs out when she says she could never be happy leading a life that she didn't deserve. Later, she breaks into his laptop and sees the stolen treasure on it, quickly ending their relationship. When Neal confronts her, she confesses to knowing about the treasure, but in the end chooses to not turn him in.

In "Pulling Strings", Sara and Neal are forced to work together to recover a missing violin, and there is romantic tension between them. Neal seems consistently jealous when she talks about a former boyfriend, the primary suspect in their case. Neal asks Sara to tell him everything, in the interest of the case. Sara tells Neal that she was engaged to the man at one point, and then claims that disclosing secrets feels good and encourages Neal to try it some time. At a concert Neal "runs into" the suspect, who Sara is on a date with, undercover. The two men get into a tense back and forth over Sara in which the suspect compares Neal to fireworks that although bright, don't generate enough heat to last. Neal returns that "The nice thing about fireworks is, they always have a second show." Neal doesn't hear, but Sara's ex-boyfriend says he can tell that she is lying to him because she can't kiss him "as passionately as she looks at Caffrey." After the case closes, Neal asks Sara where they stand. She tells him that they should be friends, but when Neal points out that "friends do occasionally go out," she agrees that he should call her sometime. 

In "Stealing Home", Peter informs Sara about Neal's potential commutation, and asks whether she would agree to be a character witness for Neal and testify on his behalf. Surprised, Sara shows up unannounced at Neal's apartment to question him about it, and they enjoy an open and honest conversation about each other that leads to a night of passion. Sara makes a decision, and agrees to testify. 

During the season finale, Sara kisses Neal after he tells her that he did indeed steal the Raphael.
Later in the episode, Sara testifies for Neal at his commutation hearing, stating that he is a "changed man" from the sociopath, liar and thief that she knew when she first testified against him. At the end of the finale, Agent Kramer comes after Neal to arrest him for public endangerment, and force Neal to work for him on an anklet in DC. On Peter's signal, Neal runs away, and escapes on a plane to an unknown tropical island with Mozzie, leaving Sara and New York behind.

Season 4 

Upon Neal's return from his island adventure in Cape Verde, in "Parting Shots", it is revealed that she still cares a lot about him when he ran away from New York, and that his departure had opened up some old wounds.

Criminal career

Known and implied crimes 
 Neal forged Atlantic Incorporated bonds. (Forging Bonds | Season 2:  episode 11)
 Neal, Kate & Mozzie ran a con and stole a Faulkner Manuscript ("Forging Bonds" | Season 2: episode 11)
 He stole Raphael's "St. George and the Dragon" in April 2005 worth $15 million. (In the Red | Season 2: episode 6, Judgment Day | Season 3: episode 16)
 He may have forged the Vinland map. (Book of Hours | Season 1: episode 3)
 He may have forged the Papyrus Seven Scrolls. (On the Fence | Season 3: episode 9)
 He once melted down stolen gold. (Flip of the Coin | Season 1: episode 4)
 He stole the McNally Solitaire worth $2.5 million which had been missing for 100 years or so and told Peter to contact the Scotland Royal Museum. It appears Neal stole the ring from another thief not the museum. (Payback | Season 2: episode 14)
 He may have stolen a Fiorentino from the Smithsonian 8 years earlier and replaced it with a chocolate one wrapped in foil. (Countdown | Season 3: episode 10)
 Neal stole Poe's Tamerlane book, a Tamayo Painting, and Washington's love letters. (All In | Season 1: episode 6)
 Neal stole the Antioch manuscripts using carrier pigeons to carry the vault combinations. (Vital Signs | Season 1: episode 10)
 Neal stole Catherine the Great's amber music box from the Italian Embassy which had also stolen it, with Mozzie and Alex's help. (Out of the Box | Season 1: episode 14)
 Neal ran a money laundering scam in Canary Islands in 2004 under the name of Nicholas Halden. (All In | Season 1: episode 6)

References 

Fictional characters from Missouri
Fictional con artists
Fictional professional thieves
Television characters introduced in 2009
Fictional white-collar criminals
American male characters in television